Windels is a surname. Notable people with the surname include:

 Paul Windels (1885–1967), American lawyer and government official
 Roger Windels (1924–1996), Belgian politician
 Sue Windels (born 1946), American politician

Dutch-language surnames